Badagongshan Township is an rural township in Sangzhi County, Zhangjiajie, Hunan Province, China.

Administrative division
The township is divided into 10 villages, the following areas: Chedahe Village, Zhujiawan Village, Bahe Village, Lishuwan Village, Jiangjiawan Village, Shadiping Village, Zhonggouwan Village, Neibanpo Village, Zhuang'erping Village, and Yaocaichang Village (车大河村、朱家湾村、扒河村、栗树湾村、蒋家湾村、砂地坪村、中沟湾村、内半坡村、庄耳坪村、药材场村).

References

Divisions of Sangzhi County